Teuvo is a masculine given name predominantly found in Finland. Individuals bearing the name include:

Teuvo Aura (1912–1999), Finnish politician
Teuvo Hakkarainen (born 1960), Finnish politician and member of Finnish Parliament
Teuvo Hatunen (1944–2010), Finnish cross-country skier
Teuvo Haverinen (born 1964), Finnish darts player 
Teuvo Kohonen, Dr. Ing (born 1934), Finnish academician and prominent researcher
Teuvo Länsivuori (born 1945), former Grand Prix motorcycle road racer
Teuvo Laukkanen (1919–2011), Finnish cross-country skier who competed in the 1940s
Teuvo Loman (born 1962), Finnish, hairdresser, model and singer living in Helsinki
Teuvo Moilanen (born 1973), former Finnish football goalkeeper
Teuvo Ojala (1947–1991), Finnish wrestler
Teuvo Pakkala (1862–1925), Finnish author, playwright, reporter, linguist and teacher
Teuvo Peltoniemi (born 1950), Finnish writer, journalist, researcher and eHealth developer
Teuvo Puro (1884–1956), Finnish actor, writer, and director
Teuvo Teräväinen (born 1994), Finnish professional ice hockey player
Teuvo Tulio (1912–2000), Finnish film director and actor
Teuvo Vilen (born 1953), Finnish footballer

References

Finnish masculine given names